Bryce Taylor (born March 19, 1989 in Broken Arrow, Oklahoma) is an American soccer player.

Career
Taylor played college soccer at Rogers State University between 2007 and 2010. During his time at RSU, Taylor also played with USL Premier Development League club DFW Tornados between 2009 and 2010.

After leaving college, Taylor stayed in the USL Premier Development League, signing with Mississippi Brilla for the 2011 season.

Taylor signed his first professional contract with USL Pro club Wilmington Hammerheads in February 2012.

In October 2013, he joined the Tulsa Revolution of the Professional Arena Soccer League.

Taylor signed with USL Pro club Austin Aztex on January 19, 2015.

Taylor was widely known for his 2017 MVP when he played for the Tulsa Roughnecks. Scoring 34 goals in only 23 games. Still a record to this day.

References

External links
 USL Pro player profile

1989 births
Living people
American soccer players
Rogers State Hillcats men's soccer players
DFW Tornados players
Mississippi Brilla players
Tulsa Revolution players
Wilmington Hammerheads FC players
Austin Aztex players
FC Tulsa players
USL League Two players
USL Championship players
Soccer players from Oklahoma
Association football forwards
Midwestern State Mustangs men's soccer players